Ayazua is a genus of moths belonging to the subfamily Tortricinae of the family Tortricidae. It consists of only one species, Ayazua hyeroglyphica, which is found in Ecuador.

The wingspan is about 30 mm. The ground colour of the forewings is pale brownish cream, but whiter along the costa and dorsum and sprinkled with cinnamon brown. The hindwings are cream with pale greyish strigulation (fine streaks).

Etymology
The generic name is an anagram of the name of the Province of Azuay. The specific name refers to the colouration of the forewing and derived from Greek/Latin hieroglyphicus (meaning hieroglyphic).

See also
List of Tortricidae genera

References

Euliini
Taxa named by Józef Razowski